Kuzören may refer to:

 Kuzören, Acıpayam
 Kuzören, Bayat, District of Bayat, Afyonkarahisar Province, Turkey
 Kuzören, Çerkeş
 Kuzören, Tercan
 Kuzören, Zara, District of Zara, Sivas Province, Turkey